Eventually, All at Once is the tenth studio album by Joan of Arc, released in 2006 on Record Label Record Label. It was recorded at the home of Donna Kinsella in Buffalo Grove, IL. It is, according to a 2018 interview, Tim Kinsella's least favorite Joan of Arc album.

Track listing
 Eventually, All At Once - 3:19
 I'm Calling Off All Falls from Grace - 3:07
 Miss Cat Piss and Peppermint - 3:14
 You Can't Change Your Mind - 2:59
 Living Out in the Sea of Umbrellas - 3:46
 Many Times I've Mistaken - 3:57
 Words Have Cast Their Spells - 4:03
 If All These People Can Understand Money - 2:52
 Scratches a Pencil - 5:02
 Free Will and Testament - 3:41

References

Joan of Arc (band) albums
2006 albums